Reginald or Reg Carr may refer to:

 Reginald Carr, one of the perpetrators of the Wichita Massacre of 2000
 Reginald Carr (librarian) (born 1946), former Bodley's Librarian at the University of Oxford
 Reg Carr (footballer) (1934–2011), Australian rules footballer